Joseph Fitz (May 24, 1886 in the Austro-Hungarian Empire – February 24, 1945) was a United States Navy Ordinary Seaman who received the Medal of Honor for actions on March 8, 1906, during the Philippine–American War. He served in the navy from 1900 to 1910, and later obtained the rank of seaman.

Medal of Honor citation
Rank and Organization: Ordinary Seaman, U.S. Navy. Born: May 24, 1886, Austria. Accredited to: Iowa. G.O. No.: 19, May 1, 1906.

Citation:

Serving in the presence of the enemy on this date, Fitz displayed bravery and extraordinary heroism.

See also

List of Medal of Honor recipients
List of Philippine–American War Medal of Honor recipients

Notes

References

Austro-Hungarian emigrants to the United States
1886 births
1945 deaths
United States Navy sailors
People from Des Moines, Iowa
United States Navy Medal of Honor recipients
American military personnel of the Philippine–American War
Foreign-born Medal of Honor recipients
Philippine–American War recipients of the Medal of Honor